Hydroxypropyl cellulose (HPC) is a derivative of cellulose with both water solubility and organic solubility.  It is used as an excipient, and topical ophthalmic protectant and lubricant.

Chemistry

HPC is an ether of cellulose in which some of the hydroxyl groups in the repeating glucose units have been hydroxypropylated forming -OCH2CH(OH)CH3 groups using propylene oxide.  The average number of substituted hydroxyl groups per glucose unit is referred to as the degree of substitution (DS). Complete substitution would provide a DS of 3.  Because the hydroxypropyl group added contains a hydroxyl group, this can also be etherified during preparation of HPC.  When this occurs, the number of moles of hydroxypropyl groups per glucose ring, moles of substitution (MS), can be higher than 3.

Because cellulose is very crystalline, HPC must have an MS about 4 in order to reach a good solubility in water.  HPC has a combination of hydrophobic and hydrophilic groups, so it has a lower critical solution temperature (LCST) at 45 °C.  At temperatures below the LCST, HPC is readily soluble in water; above the LCST, HPC is not soluble.

HPC forms liquid crystals and many mesophases according to its concentration in water.  Such mesophases include isotropic, anisotropic, nematic and cholesteric.  The last one gives many colors such as violet, green and red.

Uses

Lacrisert, manufactured by Aton Pharma, is a formulation of HPC used for artificial tears.  It is used to treat medical conditions characterized by insufficient tear production such as keratoconjunctivitis sicca), recurrent corneal erosions, decreased corneal sensitivity, exposure and neuroparalytic keratitis.  HPC is also used as a lubricant for artificial eyes.
HPC is used as a thickener, a low level binder and as an emulsion stabiliser with E number E463. In pharmaceuticals it is used as a binder in tablets.

HPC is used as a sieving matrix for DNA separations by capillary and microchip electrophoresis.

HPC is used as a thickener, emulsifier, and stabilizer in cosmetic formulations such as shampoos, conditioners, and lotions.

HPC is the main ingredient in Cellugel, which is used in book conservation. Cellugel is described as "A safe, penetrating consolidant for leather book covers affected by red rot" and is produced by Preservation Solutions.

See also

 Carboxymethyl cellulose
 Methyl cellulose
 Hypromellose

Notes and references

Excipients
Cellulose
Cellulose ethers
E-number additives